Amphitheater Mountain is a prominent  mountain summit located in Park County, Wyoming, United States.

Description 
The peak is situated southwest of the town of Cooke City, Montana, at the northeast corner of Yellowstone National Park, two miles south of the park's Northeast Entrance Station. It is part of the Absaroka Range, and a portion of the mountain is within the North Absaroka Wilderness. Volcanoes of the early Eocene supplied the material that formed the mountain 50–55 million years ago, and here created some of the most rugged terrain in Yellowstone Park. The mountain's name has been officially adopted by the United States Board on Geographic Names.

Climate 
According to the Köppen climate classification system, Amphitheater Mountain is located in a subarctic climate zone with long, cold, snowy winters, and cool to warm summers. Temperatures can drop below −10 °F with wind chill factors below −30 °F. Precipitation runoff from the mountain drains into tributaries of the Lamar River.

Gallery

See also
 List of mountain peaks of Wyoming

References

External links
 Weather forecast: Amphitheater Mountain

Mountains of Park County, Wyoming
Mountains of Wyoming
North American 3000 m summits
Mountains of Yellowstone National Park
Shoshone National Forest